Kalaben Mohanbhai Delkar (born 21 August 1971) is an Indian politician and a Member of Parliament from Dadra and Nagar Haveli parliamentary constituency in the Union Territory of Dadra and Nagar Haveli and Daman and Diu. She is the first woman Member of Parliament from Dadra and Nagar Haveli as well as the first Shiv Sena MP outside Maharastra.

Personal life
She was married to former seven time MP of DNH Mohanbhai Sanjibhai Delkar. They had one son and a daughter. She succeed him as MP after his death.

Political career
She successfully contested the 2021 by-poll from Dadra and Nagar Haveli Lok Sabha seat as a member of Shiv Sena, after the death of her husband Mohanbhai Sanjibhai Delkar. She won against Mahesh Gavit of the Bharatiya Janata Party by 51270 votes.

References

Shiv Sena politicians
People from Silvassa
Lok Sabha members from Dadra and Nagar Haveli
India MPs 2019–present
Dadra and Nagar Haveli politicians
Living people
1971 births